Samile Bermannelli (born 22 May 1998) is a Brazilian fashion model.
Bermannelli was born in Salvador, Bahia and was discovered by entering a local beauty contest sponsored by O’Boticário and Mega Model Brasil her first agency in Brazil.

Early life and career
Bermannelli was born in Salvador, Bahia and was discovered by entering a local modeling contest. She has walked the runway for Prabal Gurung, Marchesa, Brandon Maxwell, Hermès, Dolce & Gabbana, Marc Jacobs, Trussardi, Alberta Ferretti, Valentino, Off-White, Kenzo, Nina Ricci, Mugler, Ralph Lauren, Balmain, Tommy Hilfiger, Salvatore Ferragamo, Viktor & Rolf, Fendi, H&M, and Miu Miu.

She has appeared in Vogue, Vogue Brasil, and Vogue Japan. She has appeared in three Vogue France editorials, she also appeared in Numéro France, British Vogue, American Vogue, Vogue Brasil, Vogue Arabia, Vogue Japan and a cover for Wonderland magazine.

Bermannelli walked in the 2017 Victoria's Secret Fashion Show in Shanghai, China.

In 2017, Models.com listed her as a ″Top Newcomer.″

Bermannelli has also appeared on 7 covers for Harper's Bazaar Brazil.

References 

1998 births
Living people
People from Salvador, Bahia
Brazilian female models
Afro-Brazilian female models
Elite Model Management models